The Greek Civil War may refer to:

List of conflicts